A total solar eclipse occurred on June 8–9, 1956. A solar eclipse occurs when the Moon passes between Earth and the Sun, thereby totally or partly obscuring the image of the Sun for a viewer on Earth. A total solar eclipse occurs when the Moon's apparent diameter is larger than the Sun's, blocking all direct sunlight, turning day into darkness. Totality occurs in a narrow path across Earth's surface, with the partial solar eclipse visible over a surrounding region thousands of kilometres wide.
It began near sunrise over New Zealand on June 9th (Saturday), and ended west of South America on June 8th (Friday).

More details 

Eclipse Magnitude: 1.05810

Eclipse Obscuration: 1.11958

Gamma: -0.89341

Saros Series: 146th (24 of 76)

Greatest Eclipse: 08 Jun 1956 21:20:07.7 UTC (21:20:39.3 TD)

Ecliptic Conjunction: 08 Jun 1956 21:29:07.4 UTC (21:29:39.0 TD)

Equatorial Conjunction: 08 Jun 1856 21:20:45.9 UTC (21:21:17.5 TD)

Sun right ascension: 5.13

Moon right ascension: 5.13

Earth's shadow right ascension: 17.13

Sun declination: 22.9

Moon declination: 22

Earth's shadow declination: -22.9

Sun diameter: 1890.4 arcseconds

Moon diameter: 1985.8 arcseconds

Path Width at Greatest Eclipse: 428.7 km (266.4 mi)

Path Width at Greatest Duration: 428.7 km (266.4 mi)

Central Duration at Greatest Eclipse: 4 minutes, 44.85 seconds

Central Duration at Greatest Duration: 4 minutes, 44.86 seconds

Related eclipses

Solar eclipses of 1953–1956

Saros 146 

It is a part of Saros cycle 146, repeating every 18 years, 11 days, containing 76 events. The series started with partial solar eclipse on September 19, 1541. It contains total eclipses from May 29, 1938 through October 7, 2154, hybrid eclipses from October 17, 2172 through November 20, 2226, and annular eclipses from December 1, 2244 through August 10, 2659. The series ends at member 76 as a partial eclipse on December 29, 2893. The longest duration of totality was 5 minutes, 21 seconds on June 30, 1992.
<noinclude>

Notes

References

1956 06 08
1956 in science
1956 06 08
June 1956 events